The Art Stations of Naples Metro consist of 12 stations along Line 1 and Line 6 of the Naples Metro with art installations. In total, there are more than 250 works of art.

With the construction and expansion of numerous metro lines the municipality of Naples developed the project Stations of Art (also known as Hundred Stations Plan), with which it was intended to entrust the planning of metro stops to well-known contemporary artists and architects. Then, with a resolution (resolution of 19 May 2006 Number 637), the Campania region issued guidelines to be applied to the design and construction of a station.

The Art Stations, distributed along the lines 1 and 6 of the Metro network, include more than 180 pieces of art created by 90 international authors and by some young local architects, allowing them to combine different architectural styles. On November 30, 2012, the Toledo station was elected as the most beautiful of Europe by The Daily Telegraph; while the Materdei station resulted at 13th place.

Line 1

Garibaldi

Università 

Università (University) Station, designed by architects Karim Rashid, was inaugurated on March 26, 2011, thirty feet below street level, at the intersection between Piazza Giovanni Bovio and Corso Umberto I.

The metro stop, eclectic and full of color, has been designed to symbolize digital and information. In fact, Rashid said that he imagined spaces "that embodies the knowledge and language of the new digital era, which transmit ideas of simultaneous communication, innovation and their mobility of the Third Technological Revolution." In fact, next to the steps leading to the station, were put ceramic tile on which you can find many words coined since the 1960s as "network", "operating","laptop", "database" "interface" or "software".

The station hall is characterized by very striking panels and colors, the materials used to produce them are Corian and mirrored steel. In the interior there is a strong contrast between the two main colors, fuchsia pink and lime, which are also useful for direct the user to the docks.

In the lobby there are numerous works of art. Beyond the turnstiles there is the artwork Conversational Profile, two large cylindrical pillars in which it is possible to see two faces in profile, symbolizing the dialogue and communication between human beings. The second artwork, Ikon, is a large light box, in which several three-dimensional figures seem to float. Instead, among the black pillars and the light box stands Synapsi (or  Synopsis), a sculpture in brushed steel which refers to human intelligence and the neural network of the brain.

Municipio

Toledo

Dante

Museo

Materdei

Salvator Rosa

Quattro Giornate

Vanvitelli

Rione Alto

Line 6

Mergellina

Lala

Augusto

Mostra

References

.
Culture in Naples
Italian contemporary art
Public art
Naples Metro
Railway stations in Italy opened in the 21st century